Emil Hergé (born 15 January 1990) is a Swedish footballer who plays for FC Linköping City as a defender.

References

External links

1990 births
Living people
Association football midfielders
Åtvidabergs FF players
Allsvenskan players
Swedish footballers
Vimmerby IF players
FC Linköping City players